"With Every Act of Love" is the lead single on Jason Gray's fourth studio album Love Will Have the Final Word. It was released on October 22, 2013 by Centricity Music, and it was written by Gray and Jason Ingram, and produced by Ingram.

Videos
The single has an official lyric video made of the song.

Weekly charts

References 

2013 singles
2013 songs
Contemporary Christian songs
Songs written by Jason Ingram